Established in 1918, Tallinn University of Technology (TalTech) is the only technical university in Estonia. TalTech, in the capital city of Tallinn, is a university for engineering, business, public administration and maritime affairs. TalTech has colleges in Tartu and Kohtla-Järve. Despite the similar names, Tallinn University and Tallinn University of Technology are separate institutions.

History
In the early twentieth century, Estonia recognised an urgent need for locally trained engineering specialists. Until then, young people from Estonia had received their specialist education in St. Petersburg, Germany or Riga. Opportunities had to be sought for engineering-minded people to acquire an Estonian-based education which was adapted to local conditions and needs; Estonia was in the process of establishing itself as an independent country.

On 17 September 1918, the Estonian Engineering Society opened an Estonian-based engineering school named Special Engineering Courses. That date has been recognised as the founding date of Tallinn University of Technology. Programmes were offered in mechanical, electrical, civil and hydraulic engineering, shipbuilding and architecture. In 1919, the school became the private Tallinn College of Engineering, which in 1920 was declared a state institution. Teachers' efforts to develop an Estonian terminology for science and technology proved fruitful and the first engineering books were published. In 1923, the first engineering graduation theses were defended in Estonia. In the same year, a state laboratory of materials testing opened for research work.

By the 15 September 1936 Act of the Head of State, the school was granted university status, and named Tallinn Technical Institute. The institute had two faculties: civil and mechanical engineering and chemistry and mining. In 1938, the name Tallinn Technical University (Tallinna Tehnikaülikool, TTÜ in Estonian) was effective. In 1940 the Faculty of Economics, in 1958 the Faculty of Power Engineering and in 1965 the Faculty of Control Engineering were founded. After 2003 the university was known in English as Tallinn University of Technology (TUT).

On 1 July 2008, TTÜ took over International University Audentes (IUA), which became part of the Faculty of Economics and Business Administration, except the Law School which joined the Faculty of Social Sciences. In 2014 an agreement for merger of the Estonian Maritime Academy with TTÜ was signed.

On 16 November 2016, TTÜ and the Estonian Information Technology College signed a merger agreement. Since 1 August 2017, the IT College is a part of TTÜ.

On 17 September 2018, Tallinn University of Technology adopted a new short name TalTech, replacing the previous abbreviations such as TTÜ, TUT and TTU.

TalTech today
There are over 30 fully accredited international degree programmes (4 Bachelor programmes, 18 Master programmes and 10 PhD programmes) that are available fully in English.

TalTech conducts research and develops high-tech applications in many fields: 
 Organic and analytic chemistry (Chemistry) 
 Food biotechnology and neurobiology (Biotechnology) 
 Geology (Earth Sciences) 
 Power converter research (Power Electronics) 
 Solar cell materials and tribomaterials (Material Sciences) 
 Computer system research and biorobotics (ICT) 
 Near-zero energy building (Civil Engineering) 
 Public administration (Social Sciences)

Rankings

Tallinn University of Technology is the third highest-ranking university in the Baltic states, placing in the 601-800 bracket in Times Higher Education World University Rankings, the university's best-ranked departments are the life sciences and social sciences departments, which are in 176-200 and 201-250 brackets respectively. TalTech ranks in the 601-700 bracket in QS World University rankings (behind Tartu University and Vilnius University). In QS University Rankings for Eastern Europe and Central Asia 2021, TalTech ranked 31st, placing it among the top ten technical universities in the region and confirming its status as the best technical university in the Baltics. TalTech is also in the 301-500 bracket in the QS Graduate Employability Rankings.

Schools
 School of Engineering: Dean Fjodor Sergejev
 School of Business and Governance: Dean Prof. Enn Listra
 School of Science: Dean Prof. Andrus Salupere
 School of Information Technologies: Dean Prof. Gert Jervan
 Estonian Maritime Academy: Director Roomet Leiger

Departments
 Department of Computer Systems: Director Margus Kruus
 Department of Software Science: Director Marko Kääramees
 Department of Health Technologies: Director Prof. Kalju Meigas
 Thomas Johann Seebeck Department of Electronics: Director Laur Lemendik
 IT College: Director Kalle Tammemäe
 Department of Civil Engineering and Architecture: Director Prof. Jarek Kurnitski
 Department of Electrical Power Engineering and Mechatronics: Director Prof. Ivo Palu
 Department of Energy Technology: Director Prof. Andres Siirde
 Department of Materials and Environmental Technology: Director Prof. Malle Krunks
 Department of Mechanical and Industrial Engineering: Director Prof. Kristo Karjust
 Tartu College: Director Prof. Lembit Nei
 Virumaa College: Director Mare Roosileht
 Estonian Centre of Engineering Pedagogy: Head of Centre Tiia Rüütmann
 Department of Geology: Director Prof. Olle Hints
 Department of Chemistry and Biotechnology: Director Ivar Järving
 Department of Cybernetics: Acting director Prof. Jaan Janno
 Department of Marine Systems: Director Rivo Uiboupin
 Department of Economics and Finance: Director Prof. Kadri Männasoo
 Ragnar Nurkse Department of Innovation and Governance: Director Prof. Erkki Karo
 Department of Law: Director Prof. Tanel Kerikmäe
 Department of Business Administration: Director Mari Avarmaa

Tallinn University of Technology Library

The history of the library goes back to 1919.

International degree programmes in English
The internationalization of higher education is one of the key strategic goals of Tallinn University of Technology. The university offers over 30 degree programmes in English: 4 Bachelor programmes, 18 Master programmes and 9 PhD programmes.

Bachelor's level programmes in English:
Cyber Security Engineering (BSc) 
International Business Administration (BA)
Law (BA)
Integrated Engineering (BSc)

Master's level programmes in English:
Cyber Security (MSc)
Communicative Electronics (MSc)
Computer and Systems Engineering (MSc)
Technology Governance and Sustainability (MA)
E-Governance Technologies and Services (MSc)
Digital Health (MSc)
Software Engineering (MSc)
International Business Administration (MBA)
Entrepreneurial Management (MBA)
Law (MA)
 Public Sector Innovation and e-Governance (MSc)
 Industrial Engineering and Management (MSc)
 Environmental Engineering and Management (MSc)
 Design and Technology Futures (MSc)
 Materials and Processes for Sustainable Energetics (MSc)
 Technology of Wood, Plastics and Textiles (MSc)
 Mechatronics (MSc)
 Applied Physics (MSc)
PhD programmes in English:
Building and Civil Engineering and Architecture
Chemical and Materials Technology
Chemistry and Biotechnology
Economics and Business Administration
Electrical Power Engineering and Mechatronics
Information and Communication Technology
Physical Sciences
Public Administration
Mechanical Engineering

Alumni
Besides the entire technological elite of Estonia, alumni include numerous industrialists, businesspeople, and athletes.

Jüri Ratas, President of the Riigikogu, former Mayor of Tallinn and Prime Minister of Estonia
Priit Kasesalu, one of the initial developers of Skype
Hardi Meybaum, the CEO and a co-founder of GrabCAD
Tiit Vähi, the former Prime Minister and eminent industrialist
Toomas Luman, the Chairman of the Estonian Chamber of Commerce
Taavi Kotka, former Chief Information Officer of Estonian Government and leader of  e-Residency programme
Jüri Engelbrecht, the Vice President and former President of the Estonian Academy of Science
Jaak Leimann, former Minister of Economic Affairs of Estonia
Toomas Luman, Estonian entrepreneur
Jüri Mõis, former Mayor of Tallinn, Minister of the Interior, and one of the founders of Hansabank
Irina Embrich,  Olympic champion  épée fencer
Erika Kirpu,  Olympic champion  épée fencer

Partner universities
The cooperation, especially with European universities is more focused for curricula development, project cooperation and networking. In Europe, student and staff mobility is mainly organised under Erasmus programme. A selection of university-wide partnerships:

  Shanghai University
  Czech Technical University in Prague
  Charles University
  Brno University of Technology
  Czech University of Life Sciences Prague
  Masaryk University
  Mendel University in Brno
  Metropolitan University Prague
  Palacký University Olomouc
  Technical University of Liberec
  Tomas Bata University in Zlin
  University of Chemistry and Technology, Prague
  University of Economics, Prague
  University of Hradec Kralove
  University of West Bohemia
  VŠB - Technical University of Ostrava
  Aalborg University
  National University of Science and Technology
  Aalto University
  Tampere University of Technology
  Lappeenranta University of Technology
  University of Strasbourg
  Ecole Centrale de Nantes
  University of Bordeaux
  Grenoble Institute of Technology
  Ivane Javakhishvili Tbilisi State University
  Caucasus University
  Technical University Munich
  Technische Universität Darmstadt
  Kiel University of Applied Sciences
  Dresden University of Technology
  Agricultural University of Athens
  Budapest University of Technology and Economics
  IIT Delhi
  Politecnico di Torino
  Università degli Studi di Bergamo
  Kangwon National University
  Riga Technical University
  Vilnius Gediminas Technical University
  Kaunas University of Technology
  Delft University of Technology
  University of Groningen
  University of Maastricht
  Norwegian University of Science and Technology
  University of Oslo
  University of Warsaw
  University of Porto
  St. Petersburg State University of Information Technologies, Mechanics and Optics
  National University of Singapore
  Universitat Politecnica de Catalunya
  University of Alicante
  KTH Royal Institute of Technology
  Lund University
  Chalmers University of Technology
  University of Geneva
  National Institute of Development Administration
  Istanbul Technical University
  University of Edinburgh
  University of Brighton
  National Technical University of Ukraine
  The Citadel
  The University of California, Berkeley 
  Stanford University
  Salisbury University
  University of New Mexico
  National Taiwan University of Science and Technology

References

External links

 

 
Universities and colleges in Estonia
Educational institutions established in 1918
University of Technology
1918 establishments in Estonia
Universities and colleges formed by merger in Estonia